Bismarck is the capital of the U.S. state of North Dakota and the county seat of Burleigh County. It is the state's second-most populous city, after Fargo. The city's population was 73,622 in the 2020 census, while its metropolitan population was 133,626. In 2020, Forbes magazine ranked Bismarck as the seventh fastest-growing small city in the United States.

Bismarck was founded by European-Americans in 1872 on the east bank of the Missouri River. It has been North Dakota's capital city since 1889 when the state was created from the Dakota Territory and admitted to the Union.

Bismarck is across the river from Mandan, named after a Native American tribe of the area. The two cities make up the core of the Bismarck–Mandan Metropolitan Statistical Area.

The North Dakota State Capitol is in central Bismarck. The state government employs more than 4,600 in the city. As a hub of retail and health care, Bismarck is the economic center of south-central North Dakota and north-central South Dakota.

History

For thousands of years, present-day central North Dakota was inhabited by indigenous peoples, who created successive cultures. The historic Mandan Native American tribe occupied the area long before Europeans invaded. The Hidatsa name for Bismarck is mirahacii arumaaguash ("Place of the tall willows"); the Arikara name is ituhtaáwe [itUhtaáwe].

In 1872, European Americans founded a settlement at what was then called Missouri Crossing, so named because the Lewis and Clark Expedition crossed the river there on their exploration of the Louisiana Purchase in 1804–06. It had been an area of Mandan settlement. Later, the new town was called Edwinton, after Edwin Ferry Johnson, engineer-in-chief for the Northern Pacific Railway. Its construction of railroads in the territory attracted workers and settlers.

In 1873, the Northern Pacific Railway renamed the city Bismarck in honor of German chancellor Otto von Bismarck. Railroad officials hoped to attract German immigrant settlers to the area and German investment in the railroad. It is the only U.S. state capital named for a foreign statesman. The discovery of gold in the nearby Black Hills of South Dakota the following year was a greater impetus for growth. Thousands of miners came to the area, encroaching on what the Lakota considered sacred territory and leading to heightened tensions with the Native Americans. Bismarck became a freight-shipping center on the "Custer Route" from the Black Hills. In 1883 Bismarck was designated as the capital of the Dakota Territory, and in 1889 as the state capital of the new state of North Dakota.

Geography

Cityscape

The city has developed around downtown Bismarck, the center of historic development. It is distinctive because the city's major shopping center, Kirkwood Mall, is in the city center rather than in the suburbs. Several other major retail stores are in the vicinity of Kirkwood Mall, which was developed near the Bismarck Civic Center. The two Bismarck hospitals, CHI St. Alexius Medical Center and Sanford Health (previously Medcenter One Health Systems) are both downtown. The streets are lined with small stores and restaurants.

Much recent commercial and residential growth has taken place in the city's northern section, largely because of expanding retail centers. Among the shopping centers in northern Bismarck are Gateway Fashion Mall, Northbrook Mall, Arrowhead Plaza, and the Pinehurst Square "power center" mall.

The North Dakota State Capitol complex is just north of downtown Bismarck. Completed during the Great Depression in 1934, it replaced a capitol building that burned to the ground in 1930. The capitol grounds encompass the North Dakota Heritage Center, the North Dakota State Library, the North Dakota Governor's Residence, the State Office Building, and the Liberty Memorial Building. The North Dakota State Penitentiary is in eastern Bismarck.

The Cathedral District, named after the Art Deco Cathedral of the Holy Spirit, is an historic neighborhood near downtown Bismarck. Some homes in this neighborhood date to the 1880s, although many were built in the first decades of the 20th century. At times, the city has proposed widening the streets in the neighborhood to improve traffic flow. Many residents object because such a project would require the removal of many of the towering American elms which line the streets. These have escaped the elm disease that destroyed street canopies of trees in eastern cities.

After the completion of Garrison Dam in 1953 by the Army Corps of Engineers, which improved flood control, the floodplain of the Missouri River became a more practical place for development. Significant residential and commercial building has taken place in this area on the south side of the city. The Upper Missouri River is still subject to seasonal flooding.

Climate

Situated in the middle of the Great Plains, between the geographic centers of the United States and Canada, Bismarck displays a highly variable four-season humid continental climate (Köppen Dfa/Dfb). Bismarck's climate is characterized by very cold, somewhat dry, snowy, and windy winters, and warm, humid summers. Thunderstorms occur in spring and summer, but much of the rest of the year is dry.

Precipitation peaks from May to September and is rather sparse in the winter. Winter snowfall is typically light to moderate, occurring with the passage of frontal systems; major storms are rare.

Demographics

2020
As of the census of 2020, there were 73,622 people and 32,044 households residing in the city. The racial makeup of the city was 89.8% White, 2.7% African American, 4.3% Native American, 0.9% Asian, 0.1% from Native Hawaiian, and 1.8% from two or more races. Hispanic or Latino of any race were 2.5% of the population.

There were 32,044 households, the average household size of which was 2.2.

6.7% of residents were under the age of five; 21.8% of residents were between the ages of six and 18; 17% of residents were over the age of 65. The gender makeup of the city was 49.6% male and 50.4% female.

2010
As of the census of 2010, there were 61,272 people, 27,263 households, and 15,624 families residing in the city. The racial makeup of the city was 92.4% White, 0.7% African American, 4.5% Native American, 0.6% Asian, 0.3% from other races, and 1.5% from two or more races. Hispanic or Latino of any race were 1.3% of the population. In terms of ancestry, 56.1% were of German, 20.5% were of Norwegian, 7.2% were of Irish, 6.7% were of Russian, 3.7% were of American, 3.6% were of English descent.

There were 27,263 households, of which 27% had children under the age of 18 living with them (the lowest percentage in North Dakota), 44.1% were married couples living together, 9.6% had a female householder with no husband present, 3.6% had a male householder with no wife present, and 42.7% were non-families. 34.8% of all households were made up of individuals, and 11.7% had someone living alone who was 65 years of age or older. The average household size was 2.18 and the average family size was 2.82.

The median age in the city was 38 years. 20.8% of residents were under the age of 18; 11% were between the ages of 18 and 24; 26.2% were from 25 to 44; 26.8% were from 45 to 64; and 15.4% were 65 years of age or older. The gender makeup of the city was 48.6% male and 51.4% female.

2000
As of the census of 2000, there were 55,532 people, 23,185 households, and 14,444 families residing in the city. The population density was 2,065.2 per square mile (797.4/km2). There were 24,217 housing units at an average density of 900.6 per square mile (347.7/km2). The racial makeup of the city was 94.78% White, 3.39% Native American, 0.89% from two or more races, 0.75% Hispanic or Latino, 0.45% Asian, 0.28% Black or African American, 0.17% from other races and 0.03% Pacific Islander.

There were 23,185 households, of which 30.2% had children under the age of 18 living with them, 50.1% were married couples living together, 9.3% had a female householder with no husband present, and 37.7% were non-families. 31.0% of all households were made up of individuals, and 10.5% were someone living alone who was 65 years of age or older. The average household size was 2.32 and the average family size was 2.94.

In the city, the population was spread out, with 23.5% under the age of 18, 11.1% from 18 to 24, 29.1% from 25 to 44, 22.4% from 45 to 64, and 13.8% who were 65 years of age or older. The median age was 36 years. For every 100 females, there were 93.9 males. For every 100 females age 18 and over, there were 91.8 males.

The median income per household in the city was $39,422, and the median income per family was $51,477. Males had a median income of $33,804 versus $22,647 for females. The per capita income for the city was $20,789. About 5.7% of families and 8.4% of the population were below the poverty line, including 9.5% of those under age 18 and 7.4% of those age 65 or over.

Economy
According to the city's 2020 Comprehensive Annual Financial Report, the largest employers in the city are the following:

Arts and culture
The Belle Mehus Auditorium, named after a local piano teacher, is a 1914 historic building in downtown Bismarck and is a center for the arts in the area. Performances of Northern Plains Dance and the Bismarck-Mandan Symphony Orchestra are held there.

Theater companies in Bismarck include the Capitol Shakespeare Society, Sleepy Hollow Summer Theatre, the Shade Tree Players children's theater group, Dakota Stage Ltd, University of Mary, Bismarck State College, and various high school groups. The Gannon and Elsa Forde Art Galleries are at Bismarck State College. The Missouri Valley Chamber Orchestra, founded in 2000, is the community's newest orchestra and performs a variety of musical genres.

Libraries
Bismarck libraries include Bismarck Veterans Memorial Public Library and North Dakota State Library.

Sports

Amateur
High school and college sports are the main feature of the local athletics landscape. The athletic teams at the three public Bismarck high schools, Bismarck High School, Century High School, and Legacy High School, are known as The Demons, The Patriots, and The Sabers, respectively. The athletic teams at St. Mary's Central High School, Bismarck's Catholic high school, are known as The Saints. The teams at Bismarck State College and United Tribes Technical College are known as The Mystics and Thunderbirds, and both compete in the National Junior College Athletic Association. The teams at the University of Mary are The Marauders and compete in the Northern Sun Intercollegiate Conference. Bismarck has an American Legion baseball team called the Governors.

In the fall, the accent is on high school and college football. There are spirited rivalries among the several high schools in the area. Most University of Mary football games are played in the Community Bowl. Other popular winter sports include ice hockey, wrestling and basketball.

In spring, baseball is one of the city's top amateur sports, with each high school, Bismarck State College, and The University of Mary providing teams. The University of Mary also has a softball team. High schools and colleges also feature track and field during the spring.

In the summer, Bismarck has American Legion baseball and auto racing. The Fourth of July holiday is the height of rodeo time, with rodeos in Mandan and Bismarck. Slow-pitch softball is played by teams in the city. Bismarck is the host city of the world's largest charity softball tournament, the Sam McQuade Sr. softball tournament, in which more than 400 teams from the U.S. and Canada compete.

The Bismarck Bobcats hockey team of the North American Hockey League is made up of junior players (age 20 and younger, sometimes 21 if waived). The Bobcats won back-to-back Borne Cup championships as members of the America West Hockey League before merging into the NAHL in 2003. The Bobcats have made several trips to the NAHL's national tournament, claiming their first Robertson Cup title in 2010.

Since 2017, the Bismarck Larks, a Northwoods League expansion baseball team, have played their home games at the Bismarck Municipal Ballpark.

Professional
The Dakota Wizards of the NBA Development League were formerly based in Bismarck. The Wizards' first season took place in 1995 in the International Basketball Association. They won one title during their International Basketball Association days (1995–2001) and two during their Continental Basketball Association days (2001–2006). They were the 2006–07 champions of the NBA D-League, their first season in the league. The team moved to Santa Cruz, California, in 2012, a year after being purchased by the Golden State Warriors of the National Basketball Association.

Starting with the 2017 season, Bismarck was home to the Bismarck Bucks, a professional indoor football team in the Indoor Football League. Bismarck has been the home of two professional indoor football teams, the Bismarck Blaze and the Bismarck Roughriders, but both left the city soon after they were formed.

Bismarck once had a professional baseball team, the Dakota Rattlers, but the team moved to Minot after several seasons in Bismarck.

Parks and recreation
Bismarck has a large park system and an extensive network of exercise trails. The Bismarck Parks and Recreation District, established in 1927, operates many parks, swimming pools, and several golf courses within the city. The World War I Memorial Building, which is listed on the National Register of Historic Places and operated by the recreation district, serves as a community gymnasium and was recognized by a 100 Cities 100 Memorials grant in 2018.

Sertoma Park stretches more than  along the banks of the Missouri River. Within the park are several miles of biking trails and the Dakota Zoo.

There are five golf courses in Bismarck: four 18-hole courses (Apple Creek Country Club, Hawktree Golf Club, Riverwood Golf Course, and Tom O'Leary Golf Course), and one nine-hole course (Pebble Creek Golf Course).

Hunting and fishing are popular in the area, with hunting seasons for deer, pheasant, and waterfowl. Fishing is a year-round sport on the Missouri River bordering Bismarck, and there are public docks on the river. From north to south, there is a dock at the Port of Bismarck, from which the Lewis and Clark passenger riverboat plies the Missouri; Fox Island Landing, about a half mile southwest of Riverwood Golf Course; and the Bismarck Dock at General Sibley Park, which has a boat ramp and picnic facilities.

In February 2007, Bismarck broke the record for the most snow angels made in one place. A total of 8,962 participants came to the capitol grounds for the event.

Government
Bismarck operates under the city commission style of municipal government. Citizens elect four commissioners on an at-large basis for terms of four years. The commission exercises both legislative and executive powers, with each commissioner exercising oversight over several city departments. The mayor, also elected at-large, serves as president of the commission and has few powers over and above his fellow commissioners. The mayor and commissioners serve four-year terms, with a limit of three consecutive terms.

The mayor is Mike Schmitz. The city commission meets every second and fourth Tuesday of each month.

Education

Elementary, middle and high schools
The Bismarck Public Schools system operates sixteen elementary schools, three middle schools (Simle, Wachter, Horizon), three public high schools (Century High, Legacy High School, and Bismarck High) and one alternative high school (South Central High School). The system educates 13,350 students and employs 1,500 people.

Three Bismarck Catholic parishes operate primary schools (kindergarten through eighth grade): St. Mary's Grade School, St. Anne's Grade School, and Cathedral Grade School. St. Mary's Grade School, founded in 1878, is the oldest continuously operating elementary school in North Dakota.

The city has three private high schools: the Catholic St. Mary's Central High School, Shiloh Christian School, operated by Protestants, and Dakota Adventist Academy.

Higher education
There are three colleges and a university in Bismarck. The University of Mary is a four-year university, operated by the Benedictine Sisters of Annunciation Monastery. Bismarck State College is a two-year public college, and a member of the North Dakota University System. United Tribes Technical College is a two-year tribal college. Sanford Health, formerly Medcenter One, operates a nursing school that offers a Bachelor of Science in nursing. The campus is just north of the medical center in central Bismarck.

Media

Print
Bismarck is served by the Bismarck Tribune, the city's daily newspaper. Established in 1873, the paper is the oldest continuously operating business in the city. The Tribune is the official newspaper of the city of Bismarck, Burleigh County, and the state of North Dakota. The daily newspapers of other major cities in North Dakota are also available at area newsstands.

Television
Bismarck is the center of a television market covering most of western North Dakota and portions of Montana. Five stations are based in Bismarck. The four commercial stations have rebroadcasters in Minot, Williston, and Dickinson. The stations are:
KBME (ATSC RF channel 22) – virtual channels 3.1 PBS, 3.2 World, 3.3 Minnesota Channel, 3.4 Lifelong Learning
KFYR (ATSC RF channel 31) – virtual channels 5.1 NBC, 5.2 Me-TV
KXMB (ATSC RF channel 12) – virtual channels 12.1 CBS, 12.3 Weather
KBMY (ATSC RF channel 17) – virtual channels 17.1 ABC
KNDB (ATSC RF channel 26) – virtual channels 26.1 Fox

Bismarck also carries KWMK, an affiliate of The CW, on cable channel 14; as well as Public-access television channels, on cable TV channels 2 and 12.

Radio
Bismarck supports 27 radio stations. Most of the commercial stations are owned by either iHeartMedia or Cumulus Media. Many of the lower frequency stations are broadcasters of national Christian radio networks. The local stations are:

FM frequencies
KBMK 88.3 FM (Contemporary Christian music) K-Love network affiliate
K204FG 88.7 FM (Christian) BBN translator
KLBF 89.1 FM (Christian) Faith Radio from the University of Northwestern - St Paul
KNRI 89.7 FM (Christian rock) Air 1 affiliate
KCND 90.5 FM (Public Radio) Prairie Public Radio
KXRP 91.3 FM (Christian) Family Radio affiliate
KPHA 91.7 FM (Catholic) Real Presence Radio
KYYY 92.9 FM (Adult Contemporary) "Mix 92.9"
KBEP-LP 93.7 FM (Christian) 3ABN affiliate
KQDY 94.5 FM (Country) "KQ 94.5"
K237FQ 95.3 FM translator simulcasting KJIT-LP
KBYZ 96.5 FM (Classic rock) "The Walleye"
KKCT 97.5 FM (Top 40/CHR) "Hot 97-5"
KACL 98.7 FM (Classic hits) "Cool 98.7"
K259AF 99.7 FM translator simulcasting KFYR-AM
KLBE-LP 100.7 FM (Christian rock) "Club Radio"
KSSS 101.5 FM (Mainstream Rock) "Rock 101"
KUSB 103.3 FM (Country) "US 103.3"
KNDR 104.7 FM (Contemporary Christian music)
KKBO 105.9 FM (Country) "Big Rig 105.9"
KJIT-LP 106.7 FM (Contemporary Christian music) Radio 74 affiliate
KXRV 107.5 FM (Classic Hits) "Mojo 107.5"

AM frequencies
KFYR 550 AM (News/Talk/Sports/Oldies/Classic Hits/Top 40/CHR) "K-Fire"
KXMR 710 AM (Sports) "ESPN 710"
KBMR 1130 AM (Classic country) "Bismarck's original country station"
KLXX 1270 AM (Talk)
KDKT 1410 AM (Sports) "Fox Sports Radio 1410"
WQDL503 1610 AM (Traveler's Information Station), North Dakota Department of Transportation

NOAA Weather Radio station WXL78 broadcasts from Bismarck on 162.475 MHz.

Infrastructure

Health care
Bismarck is a regional center for health care. The city has two hospitals: CHI St. Alexius Medical Center (285-bed) and Sanford Health (238-bed). When it opened in 1885, St. Alexius was the first hospital in Dakota Territory and the Catholic facility is the oldest health care provider in the state. St. Alexius and Medcenter One have joined forces to form the Bismarck Cancer Center. Medcenter One was founded in 1908 as Bismarck Evangelical Hospital. In 1955, it was renamed Bismarck Hospital. In 1984, it was renamed MedCenter One, and in 2012, it became part of the Sanford Health system.

Transportation

Public transit

The Capital Area Transit System (CAT), operated by Bis-Man Transit, began operations in May 2004. This public bus system has eleven routes throughout Bismarck and Mandan, Monday-Saturday. Bis-Man Transit also operates a para-transit service for senior citizens and people with disabilities.

Bismarck had electric streetcar service from 1904 to 1931.

Aviation
Bismarck Municipal Airport is south of the city. It has the largest passenger volume in western North Dakota and the second highest within the state. The airport is served by United Express, Allegiant Air, Delta Air Lines, and American Eagle. A new $15 million terminal opened in May 2005. The previous terminal was built in the mid-1960s and expanded in the mid-1970s. After a windstorm collapsed part of the roof connecting the expanded terminal to the original building, officials decided to demolish the entire complex and build the new terminal.

Rail service
The BNSF Railway runs east–west through the city. The railway was originally integral to the growth of Bismarck and Mandan. Today it is used for freight. Due to restructuring in the railroad industry, there has not been passenger train service to Bismarck station since Amtrak's North Coast Hiawatha service ended in 1979. The closest Amtrak station is in Minot, 106 miles (170 kilometers) north of Bismarck, which is served by the Empire Builder.

Roadways
Two federal highways pass through Bismarck. Interstate 94 runs east–west through the city. The north–south U.S. Route 83 merges in north Bismarck with Interstate 94 and runs east for roughly  before turning south.

Walking and cycling
BisParks BCycle is a public bikeshare system with four docks situated around the city. Bismarck is not ranked as a walk-friendly community, and is rated bronze for bike-friendliness.

Notable people

 Sam Aanestad, dentist and California state legislator
 David Andahl, businessman and politician
 Shane Balkowitsch, American wet plate photographer
Carmen Berg, Playboy Playmate (July 1987)
Leslie Bibb, actress
 Paula Broadwell, a consultant and author and extramarital partner of General David Petraeus
 John Burke, state Supreme Court Justice, tenth governor of North Dakota, 24th Treasurer of the United States
 Gary Cederstrom, Major League Baseball umpire
 Neil Churchill, Bismarck mayor
 Dale Clausnitzer, Minnesota state legislator and businessman
 Kent Conrad, U.S. Senator
 Ronnie Cramer, artist, filmmaker 
 Dale DeArmond, printmaker and book illustrator
 Weston Dressler, Saskatchewan Roughriders slotback
 Shannon Galpin, founder of "Strength in Numbers"
 Linnea Glatt, post-modern sculptor and installationist
 Todd Hendricks, former professional football player
 John Hoeven, U.S. Senator, (since 2011) 31st Governor of North Dakota (2000–2010)
 Clay Jenkinson, Author, Thomas Jefferson scholar
 Thomas S. Kleppe, former Bismarck mayor, 41st U.S. Secretary of the Interior
 Brock Lesnar, wrestler and former heavyweight UFC champion
 Jamalcolm Liggins, professional football player
 Cara Mund, Miss America 2018
 Mike Peluso, right wing with the Chicago Blackhawks and Philadelphia Flyers
 John Andrew Rea, newspaper editor, helped draft the state constitution
 Mel Ruder, Pulitzer Prize winning journalist
 Ed Schafer, 30th Governor of North Dakota, 29th U.S. Secretary of Agriculture
 Jonathan Twingley, artist, illustrator and novelist
 Carson Wentz, professional football player for the Washington Commanders

Mayors of Bismarck

 Edmond Hackett; 1875
 John A. Mclean; 1875–1877
 George Peoples; 1877–1881
 R. B. Thurston; 1881–1882
 James W Raymond; 1882–1884
 John P. Dunn; 1884–1885
 John E. Carland; 1885–1886
 Israel P Hunt; 1886–1887
 William A. Bently; 1887–1890
 Isaac P. Baker; 1890–1891
 William A. Bently; 1891–1892
 Edward S. Allen; 1892–1894
 Albert N. Leslie; 1894–1896
 Edward G. Patterson; 1896–1900
 Francis H. Register; 1901–1905
 William H. Webb; 1905–1907
 Francis R. Smyth; 1907–1909
 Erastus A. Williams; 1909–1913
 Arthur W. Lucas; 1913–1921
 Amil P. Lenhart; 1921–1937
 Obert A. Olson; 1937–1938
 Neil O. Churchill; 1939–1946
 Amil P. Lenhart; 1946–1950
 Thomas S. Kleppe; 1950–1954
 Evan Lips; 1954–1966
 Ed V. Lahr; 1966–1974
 Robert O. Heskin; 1974–1978
 Eugene Leary; 1978–1986
 Marlan Haakenson; 1986–1990
 Bill Sorensen; 1990–2002
 John Warford; 2002–2014
 Mike Seminary; 2014–2018
 Steve Bakken; 2018–2022
 Mike Schmitz; 2022–present

See also
 Bismarck Air Museum
 Bismarck-Mandan Symphony Orchestra
 North Dakota Heritage Center

Notes

References

External links

City of Bismarck official website

 Bismarck, capital of North Dakota (1916) from the Digital Horizons website
 Bismarck, capital of North Dakota (1923) from the Digital Horizons website

 
Cities in North Dakota
Cities in Burleigh County, North Dakota
County seats in North Dakota
Populated places established in 1872
North Dakota populated places on the Missouri River
1872 establishments in Dakota Territory